Auguste Philippe Marocco (30 August 1885 – 26 November 1972) was a Monegasque painter. His work was part of the art competitions at the 1928 Summer Olympics and the 1936 Summer Olympics.

References

1885 births
1972 deaths
Monegasque painters
Olympic competitors in art competitions